Crossing may refer to:

 Crossing (2008 film), a South Korean film
 Crossing (album), a 1985 album by world music/jazz group Oregon
 Crossing (architecture), the junction of the four arms of a cruciform church
 Crossing (knot theory), a visualization of intersections in mathematical knots
 Crossing (physics), the relation between particle and antiparticle scattering
 Crossing (plant), deliberate interbreeding of plants
 Crossing oneself, a ritual hand motion made by some Christians
 William Crossing (1847–1928), English writer
 Intersection (road), also known as a crossing
 Level crossing, a railway crossing a street

See also

 Crossings (disambiguation)
 The Crossing (disambiguation)
 Cross (disambiguation)